"Too Young to Die" is a song by British funk and acid jazz band Jamiroquai, released as the second single from their debut studio album, Emergency on Planet Earth (1993). The original version of the track runs at 10:18; however, both the single and album versions were cut, running at 3:22 and 6:05, respectively. The single received positive reviews from music critics, who were comparing the singer to Stevie Wonder. It peaked at number 10 on the UK Singles Chart and reached the top 50 in France, Iceland, the Netherlands, Sweden, and Switzerland. The track's stems were made available to the public in March 2013 as part of a remix competition for the song; as such, there is an abundance of bootleg remixes to the song in addition to the official remixes. The competition was won by Australian DJ and music producer Late Nite Tuff Guy.

Background
The commercial single includes all three versions of the track. The song's lyrics are about the fear of war and death due to political machinations. The single's cover art depicts Jay Kay in the background, looking into the camera, with a sky-blue "grill" of the Buffalo Man in the left, as hollow spots, which are slowly morphing into solid blue crosses (specifically, headstones), which are the polar opposites to the meaning of the buffalo man. This morphing happens as one moves their eyes from left to right over the cover of the single. There is also a banner near the bottom of the sleeve which has several images on it, including a picture of a baby with a caption beside it reading "Too Young to Die", an image of the mushroom cloud, and a Swastika, with the latter having a red "X" over it.

Critical reception
Pan-European magazine Music & Media wrote, "An uplifting strings intro heralds Jamiroquai's follow-up to last year's massive "When You Gonna Learn". Jay's "Stevie Wonder"-ful voice grabs the melody and envelopes itself in a warm overcoat of horns, funky guitar and intricate percussion accompaniment worthy of a Roy Ayers set. "Real" music for the acid jazzed amongst you." Alan Jones from Music Week described it as a "loose and attractive retro-funk workout that owes more to the Seventies than the Nineties." Kevin L. Carter from Philadelphia Inquirer commented, "Jamiroquai is a big Stevie Wonder fan. His vocal flourishes and hooks on "Too Young to Die" are obvious borrowings, but they're done so earnestly, and the song is so deftly arranged, it just about gets over." 

Dr Bob Jones from the RM Dance Update stated, "This is pure soul jazz with the funky bassline. A simple worldly message is scattered over a tight rhythm section with horn stabs Seventies-style. Pure class — one to raise some dust!" Tony Cross from Smash Hits gave the song four out of five, commenting, "Led by the young (but still Stevie Wonder sounding) lead singer Jay, Jamiroquai have updated dark and dirty '70s funk. This is a stylish anti-war song that has really got what it takes. The obscenely talented Jamiroquai will go from strength to strength." Another editor, Pete Stanton, noted that it "feature a multitude of enticing grooves (plus plenty of do-do-do-dad-dos)."

Music video
A music video was shot for "Too Young to Die". It was directed by British director W.I.Z. (a.k.a. Andrew John Whiston), and consisted mainly of Jay Kay singing in what appears to be a desert military installation. The video was later published by Vevo on YouTube in November 2009. As of December 2022, it had generated more than 13 million views.

Track listings
 UK 12-inch vinyl
 "Too Young to Die" (Extended Version) - 10:18
 "Too Young to Die" (Original) - 6:05
 "Too Young to Die" (Instrumental) - 6:22

 UK CD single
 "Too Young to Die" (7" Edit) - 3:22
 "Too Young to Die" (Extended Version) - 10:18
 "Too Young to Die" (Original) - 6:05
 "Too Young to Die" (Instrumental) - 6:22

 Japanese CD single
 "Too Young to Die" (7" Edit) - 3:22
 "When You Gonna Learn" (Digeridoo) - 3:48
 "Too Young to Die" (Original) - 6:05
 "When You Gonna Learn" (Cante Hondo Mix) - 5:49

Charts

See also
 List of anti-war songs

References

1992 songs
1993 singles
Anti-war songs
Jamiroquai songs
Music Week number-one dance singles
Protest songs
Songs about nuclear war and weapons
Songs against racism and xenophobia
Songs written by Jason Kay
Songs written by Toby Smith
S2 Records singles